Hyoscyamine/hexamethylenetetramine/phenyl salicylate/methylene blue/benzoic acid (trade names Methylphen, Prosed DS) is a drug combination. It is not safe or effective for any medical purpose.

References

Urologicals
Combination drugs